Melt Away may refer to
 Melt Away: A Tribute to Brian Wilson, 2022 album by She & Him
 "Melt Away", 1988 Brian Wilson song from his album Brian Wilson
 "Melt Away", 1995 Mariah Carey song from her album Daydream